The Ben Nye Makeup Company was started in 1967 by Hollywood film industry makeup artist Ben Nye. Its current CEO is Nye's son, Dana Nye. The company is a family-owned business that is dedicated to serving professionals throughout the world. In 2017, The Ben Nye Makeup Company celebrated their 50-year anniversary.

Ben Nye Makeup Company's range of professional cosmetic and special effects products are commonly used in television, stage, and film performance. Ben Nye Makeup Company produces products such as foundations, cosmetic powders, eyeshadows, concealers, face paints, body paints, fake blood, liquid latex, fixing sprays, brushes and tools.

Since its early emergent years, Ben Nye was a renowned makeup artist known by many popular films and performances such as Diary of Anne Frank, Sound of Music, the Planet of the Apes, The King and I, and the most pivotal Oscar award winner— Gone with the Wind.

In this late 1930s film that Ben Nye recognized there was no range of colors for ethnic actors. He started designing foundations and contour shades for brown and olive complexions, including Oscar winner, Hattie McDaniel, who portrayed Mammy in GWTW.

He was known as a creative director, an innovator, and prided himself in realism with films that included special effects, bruising, battle wounds, aging and even prosthetics for characters such as the Fly, Abraham Lincoln and Queen Victoria.

About the creator 
Ben Nye was born Benjamin Emmet Nye Sr., in Fremont, Nebraska.

Usage 
While Ben Nye products are known as a professional brand and not considered an "everyday makeup", they have a full range of beauty products. Influencers such as the Kardashians have been associated with Ben Nye and makeup artists Joyce Bonelli, Mary Phillips, and Mario Dedivanovic have featured Ben Nye's powders on makeup tutorials featuring Kardashians. Since word got out, Ben Nye's Colorless Powder and Banana Powder have sold rapidly, with YouTube beauty bloggers also promoting the product and endorsing it. Mainly, Ben Nye's powders remain high on the market for everyday people, and entertainment performance.

In addition to film and television productions, Ben Nye products are widely used for professional operas, stage productions and haunted houses. Performers at Universal Studios,  Walt Disney World and with Cirque du Soleil are regular users of Ben Nye.  Additionally, students in theatre and makeup school are often recommended Ben Nye Makeup Kits for education and production. From the color consistency to vibrancy,  Ben Nye products are valued components in many artist's and performer's kits. This company has set itself apart from others in the industry due to its credibility and history. In addition to its well trusted formulas, products are cruelty free and paraben-free.

Ben Nye Company 
Ben Nye Makeup headquarters is located in Los Angeles, California, where products are manufactured and distributed. Ben Nye products are sold worldwide through stores specializing in makeup for the professional industry.

Purchasing 
Authentic Ben Nye products are available through their authorized dealers, both in store or online. A dealer store locator is available at: www.bennye.com. Ben Nye products are NOT authorized to be sold from third-party selling sites. Illegitimately sold products found on Amazon or eBay, for example, are not warranted by the company and may be counterfeit. A product catalog can be viewed and downloaded from the Ben Nye website.

Products include foundations, contours, powders, adhesives, sealers and cleansers, palates, blood, latex and 3D effects, color guides, clown makeup, theatrical and personal kits, eyeshadows, face painting, hair and character effects, Halloween makeup kits, paint and glitter, brushes sponges and makeup tools.

Ben Nye Company in the Media 
Ben Nye Company's products have been featured in articles such as Glamour, multiple features in Make-Up Mania, Allure, InStyle, People Magazine and more. The Ben Nye banana powder is often mentioned by many beauty bloggers and beauty influencers. Beauty influencers on YouTube often compare Ben Nye to its competitors, giving viewers honest and detailed reviews of the product. Some influencers who have mentioned Ben Nye are Jackie Aina, Briana Monique, and Sophiology. Aside from being mentioned in multiple beauty bloggers/influencers' pages, Ben Nye has been featured by theatre groups and forums as the best makeup used in theatre.

References

External links
Ben Nye Makeup Company
Red Carpet FX®
Ben Nye Makeup Review

Chemical companies established in 1967
Cosmetics companies of the United States
Companies based in California
History of cosmetics
1967 establishments in the United States
1967 establishments in California